Crooks Anonymous is a British comedy film from 1962. Directed by Ken Annakin, it stars Leslie Phillips and Stanley Baxter and is notably the feature film debut of Julie Christie.

Plot
Captain "Dandy Forsdyke" (Leslie Phillips) is a habitual criminal who can't resist a tempting robbery. His gifts are for pickpocketing and safecracking. He  never uses his real name, of which he's ashamed. However, he is engaged to Babette (Julie Christie), a stripper who wants him to go straight before they marry.

In love with Babette, he desperately wants to quit, but is always lured back into another crime by his associates. Babette comes across a society known as Crooks Anonymous which helps hardened thieves go straight. Founded by Mr Montague (Wilfrid Hyde-White), and funded by a generous legacy, they have an excellent track record. Babette agrees to help them cure Forsdyke.

Forsdyke is picked up during a robbery by a Crooks Anonymous man, Brother Widdowes (Stanley Baxter), who is disguised as a policeman, and taken to the Crooks Anonymous' headquarters. Confronted by Montague, Forsdyke admits that he wants to give up crime and marry Babette. They begin to interrogate him, and discover that he is a habitual liar, whose real name is Cox, who has never seen military service, despite his claim to be a decorated veteran.

Widdowes and Montague embark Forsdyke on a dose of punishment therapy and rehabilitation. They begin by locking him in a room filled with safes, which contain cigarettes, food, drink and a number of booby traps which make opening them a hazardous business. After a week of this torture, Forsdyke is beginning to crack. Nonetheless, he fails a test to see how much progress he has made, reverting to his old ways as soon as he is outside.

After a month of correctional therapy and reinforcement training, Forsdyke finally passes the test and is released into society. He moves into a house with Babette, gets a job working as Father Christmas in a department store and refuses an offer by one of his old pals to go back into criminality.

However, after consuming large amounts of alcohol at a Christmas party he passes out and finds himself alone in the department store, with £250,000 of takings near him in the safe. Forsdyke breaks in intending to steal the money, and then panicking at his relapse, calls Crooks Anonymous for help. They send their two top men, including Brother Widdowes, who also cave at the sight of the money. They in turn call for Senior Brother, who arrives with his Secretary.

Confronted with this unique opportunity, the five of them decide to steal the money and split it among themselves. They make good their escape, past the drunken night watchmen and head through the streets. They go to Forsdyke's house, only to be confronted by an outraged Babette, who demands they put the money back. Grudgingly they agree, as she threatens to call Scotland Yard and inform them of the burglary.

They successfully manage to return the money, unfortunately triggering an alarm which brings the night watchmen out. Just making good their escape, they breathe a sigh of relief. Forsdyke marries Babette and as a sign of appreciation they make her a Guardian Angel of Crooks Anonymous, for keeping them all honest.

Cast
 Leslie Phillips - Captain "Dandy" Forsdyke/Fred Cox
 Stanley Baxter - Brother Widdowes
 Wilfrid Hyde-White - Senior Brother Montague
 Julie Christie - Babette
 James Robertson Justice - Sir Harvey Russelrod
 Michael Medwin - Ronnie
 Pauline Jameson - Sister Prunella
 Robertson Hare - Grimsdale
 Raymond Huntley - Wagstaffe
 Dermot Kelly - Stanley
 Norman Rossington - Bert  
 Harry Fowler - Woods  
 Charles Lloyd-Pack - Fletcher  
 Harold Goodwin - George  
 Harry Locke - Fred 
 Colin Gordon - Drunk 
 Jeremy Lloyd - M.C. at the Peekaboo Club
 Dennis Waterman - Boy in park
 Bryan Coleman - Holding 
 Arthur Mullard - Grogan 
 Joyce Blair - Carol 
 Timothy Bateson - Partrige 
 John Bennett - Thomas  
 Victor Brooks - Police Officer
 Julian Orchard - 1st Jeweller 
 Patrick Newell - 2nd Jeweller   
 Alfred Burke - Caulfield 
 Arthur Lovegrove - Jones 
 Cardew Robinson - Wiseman - Helicopter Brother 
 Dick Emery - Reginald Cundell
 Totti Truman Taylor
 Joby Blanshard - Peekaboo Doorman
 Frank Gatliff - Policeman in the park
 Marianne Stone
 Jerold Wells - Sydney - large Nightwatchman
 Dandy Nichols - Mrs Cundell
 David Drummond - Assistant to Sir Harvey Russelrod

Critical reception
TV Guide found "some amusing moments", and Screenonline an "amusing, lightweight" comedy.

References

External links
 
 
 

1962 films
1962 comedy films
British comedy films
British crime comedy films
British black-and-white films
Films set in department stores
Films directed by Ken Annakin
1960s English-language films
1960s British films